Pietro Antonio Spinelli (18 January 1597 – 9 December 1645) was a Roman Catholic prelate who served as Archbishop of Rossano (1629–1645).

Biography
Pietro Antonio Spinelli was born in Torre, Italy, on 18 January 1597. On 28 May 1629, he was appointed during the papacy of Pope Urban VIII as Archbishop of Rossano. On 4 June 1629, he was consecrated bishop by Carlo Emmanuele Pio di Savoia, Cardinal-Bishop of Albano, with Paolo Emilio Santori, Archbishop of Urbino, and Ranuccio Scotti Douglas, Bishop of Borgo San Donnino, serving as co-consecrators. He served as Archbishop of Rossano until his death on 9 December 1645.

Episcopal succession
While bishop, he was the principal co-consecrator of:
Onorato Onorati, Bishop of Urbania e Sant'Angelo in Vado (1636);
Urbano Zambotti, Bishop of Montemarano (1640);
Vencent Cavaselice, Bishop of Carinola (1640); and
Gregorio Panzani, Bishop of Mileto (1640).

References

External links and additional sources
 (for Chronology of Bishops)
 (for Chronology of Bishops)

17th-century Italian Roman Catholic archbishops
Bishops appointed by Pope Urban VIII
1597 births
1645 deaths